T-Palette Records is a Japanese record label, specializing in idols. It is a subsidiary of the Japanese franchise of Tower Records.

History 
The record label was launched in June 2011.

The first artist of the new label, Vanilla Beans, was rented to it by Tokuma Japan Communications. Such an unusual case when an artist was transferred from one record label to another on rent, attracted attention in the media.。

Roster

Current 
As of May 4, 2014.
 Vanilla Beans (since June 2011; rented from Tokuma Japan)
 Negicco (since July 2011)
  (Shizukaze since November 2011, Kizuna since March 2012)
 Lyrical School (since 2012; transferred from File Records)
 Up Up Girls (Kakko Kari) (since 2012; transferred from the independent record label Up-Front Works; the transfer announced at the concert titled Up Up Girls (Kakko Kari) 1st Live Daikan'yama Kessen (Kakko Kari))
  (since summer 2013)
 Na-Na (NA-NA) (since summer 2013)
  (since summer 2013)
 amihime (since February 2014; solo project of LinQ member Ami Himesaki; announced at the concert titled T-Palette Records Thanksgiving 2013)

Former 
 LinQ (November 2011 – February 2013)
  (since March 2013; joined from Aries Entertainment)
 Tomato n'Pine — only live DVDs

Events 
 T-Palette Records 1st. Anniversary Live (9 June 2012, Harajuku Astro Hall)
 T-Palette Records Kansha-sai 2012 (9 December 2012, Shinagawa Stellar Ball)
 T-Palette Records Kansha-sai 2013 (December 15, 2013, Laforet Museum Roppongi)

References

External links 
 
 
 

Japanese record labels
Record labels established in 2011